Gråhøe is a mountain on the border of Dovre Municipality and Sel Municipality in Innlandet county, Norway. The mountain is surrounded by several other notable mountains including Indre Bråkdalshøe to the south, Sagtindan and Trolltinden to the southeast, and Vassberget to the east.

See also
List of mountains of Norway by height

References

Sel
Dovre
Mountains of Innlandet